= Pearl Wedro =

Polish-Canadian trade union organizer (died 1973)

Wedro in 1937

Pearl Wedro (died 3 March 1973) was a Polish-Canadian furrier, trade union organizer, and Communist Party of Canada activist. Wedro was a lifelong activist in the Jewish labour movement.

In the early 1930s she and Freda Coodin helped lead a strike against Hurtig Furs in Winnipeg, and at one point she was injured by a strikebreaker. Following the strike, she was blacklisted from working in the city. She eventually found work in a factory in Toronto, representing her local at the Toronto Fur Board. She also organized the workers of small shoemakers in Vancouver.
